Bonde söker fru ("Farmer Seeks Wife") is a Swedish reality television program broadcast by TV4 based on the Fremantle format ''Farmer Wants a Wife. It features a number of single farmers who get to meet a number of potential partners and host some of them on their farms and go on an extended date with one. When a marriage results, it is televised.

The program premiered in 2006 with two episodes in the spring where the farmers were presented. Those interested in the farmers then write to them through the program. The main show is then shown in the autumn. It proved very successful, averaging 1.5 million viewers per episode.

From the second season, the show has included female farmers. The third season, in 2008, included a gay farmer.

External links 
 
 

TV4 (Sweden) original programming
Swedish reality television series
2006 Swedish television series debuts